Viktor Agardius (born 23 October 1989) is a Swedish footballer who plays for Brommapojkarna as a left-back or centre-back.

Club career
On 4 February 2020, he joined Italian Serie B club Livorno.

On 29 May 2020, he returned to Mjällby AIF.

On 9 February 2021 he signed a two-year contract with IFK Norrköping.

References

External links

Kalmar FF profile

1989 births
Living people
Swedish footballers
Swedish expatriate footballers
Association football defenders
Mjällby AIF players
IFK Norrköping players
Kalmar FF players
U.S. Livorno 1915 players
Allsvenskan players
Serie B players
Swedish expatriate sportspeople in Italy
Expatriate footballers in Italy